The brownspotted wrasse (Notolabrus parilus), also known as the blue-spotted parrotfish, brown-spotted parrotfish and orangespotted wrasse,  is a species of marine ray-finned fish from the family Labridae, the wrasses. It is found in the Indian Ocean off the western and southern coasts of Australia.

Description
The males of this specie have a dark brown or greyish brown background colour, with an interrupted horizontal white band
running the length of the body. They also have gold or brown markings on their scales. The females and juveniles are a lighter shade of brown than the males or may be greenish, with white blotches on scales, and grey and brown barring across body.

Distribution
The brownspotted wrasse is distributed from Shark Bay, Western Australia around the southern coastline of Australia as far as southern Victoria. They are most numerous off Western Australia, especially off the south western coast of the state, they are less abundant in South Australia and Victoria is the edge of their range where they are very rare.

Habitat and biology
The brownspotted wrasse is found in the vicinity of rocky reefs with seaweeds, it prefers sheltered, moderately exposed and slightly more exposed areas. It occurs at depths of  but has been recorded at greater depths. The juveniles are sometimes recorded in beds of sea grass. This species is a carnivore which feeds on a variety of benthic invertebrates found in areas with a sand substrate, among sea grass and seaweeds. They prey upon gastropods, amphipods, isopods, prawns, crabs and echinoids.

This species is a protogynous hermaphrodite, it switches sex from female to male at some stage in its life cycle. Spawning takes place the late austral winter to early spring. The eggs are laid among seagrass and reef habitats with the eggs and larvae being pelagic.

Species description and etymology
Notolabrus parilus was first formally described in 1850 as Tautoga parila by Scottish naturalist John Richardson (1787-1865) with the type locality given as King George Sound in Western Australia. The specific name parila is the name given to this species by the aboriginal inhabitants of Port George Sound area.

References 

brownspotted wrasse
Marine fish of Southern Australia
Marine fish of Western Australia
brownspotted wrasse